The 2011 Korean Basketball League rookie draft (Korean: 2011 KBL 국내신인선수 드래프트) was held on January 31, 2011, at the Education and Cultural Center in Yangjae-dong, Seoul, South Korea. Out of the 44 players who participated in the draft, 35 were selected. Anyang KGC won the lottery for the first overall pick, having finished in eighth place during the 2009–10 season.

Draft selections
This table only shows the first twenty picks.

Players
The 2011 draft was highly anticipated by observers and KBL coaches as it included seniors responsible for Chung-Ang University's record-breaking run of 52 consecutive wins in the collegiate basketball league (from November 2008 to November 2009). The main players, center Oh Se-keun and point guard Kim Sun-hyung, have gone on to win the KBL Championship and the KBL Most Valuable Player Award and were key players in the South Korean national team winning gold in the 2014 Asian Games.

The third pick of the draft Choi Jin-soo is the first South Korean to receive a NCAA Division I basketball scholarship and played for the University of Maryland. He was the youngest of the draft class as the "early entry" option was still unheard of at that time and nearly all participants were college seniors. The third overall pick, he was chosen by Goyang Orions, where his father Kim Yoo-taek was then a member of the coaching staff.

Notes

See also
Korean Basketball League draft

References

External links
 Draft: 2011 KBL Domestic Player draft results / 드래프트: 2011 KBL 국내신인선수 드래프트 결과 — Korean Basketball League official website 

Korean Basketball League draft
Korean Basketball League draft
2010s in Seoul
Korean Basketball League draft
Sport in Seoul
Events in Seoul